Luboš Hruška (born 21 July 1987) is a Czech football defender who currently plays for Uhelné sklady Prague. He has played top-level football for Viktoria Žižkov in the Gambrinus liga.

References

External links
at mfkzemplin.sk
at eurofotbal.cz

1987 births
Living people
Czech footballers
Association football defenders
Czech First League players
FK Viktoria Žižkov players
MFK Zemplín Michalovce players
2. Liga (Slovakia) players
Expatriate footballers in Slovakia
Czech expatriate sportspeople in Slovakia